The fifth elections for Cardiganshire County Council took place in March 1901. They were preceded by the 1898 election and followed by the 1904 election

Overview of the Results
The Liberals once again won by a large majority but there were signs that elections were becoming less political, with candidates of similar political persuasions opposing each other and some candidates not openly declaring any political affiliation. Neither the Cambrian News or the Aberystwyth Observer indicated party affiliation although the Brython Cymreig did so in relation to the contested elections only. The Welsh Gazette commented that while the contests at Aberystwyth were on political lines, many of those in the rural areas were between candidates whose political views were often indistinguishable. In many ways this reflected the changes in the politics of the county, now represented at Westminster by the former Conservative, Matthew Vaughan Davies.

Contested Elections

The vast majority of councillors were elected unopposed. Only ten of the 48 wards were contested at the election.

Retiring Aldermen

Eight aldermen retired, all of whom were Liberals. Of these only Morgan Evans in Llanarth and James Stephens in Cardigan South sought election. Neither was re-elected an alderman. Of those who stood down, J.H. Davies, Enoch Davies and Daniel Jones retired from county politics but C.M. Williams, T.H.R. Hughes and J.T. Morgan were later re-elected aldermen (the latter for the second time) without facing the electorate. This was the first occasion upon which those aldermen later re-elected had not faced the electorate.

The New Council

|}

|}

|}

Results

Aberaeron

Aberbanc

Aberporth

Aberystwyth Division 1

Aberystwyth Division 2

Aberystwyth Division 3

Aberystwyth Division 4

Aeron

Borth

Bow Street

Cardigan North

Cardigan South

Cilcennin
Jenkin Lewis was described as a Liberal candidate in one newspaper but this may not have been correct.

Cwmrheidol

Devil's Bridge

Felinfach

Goginan

Lampeter Borough

Llanarth

Llanbadarn Fawr

Llanddewi Brefi

Llandygwydd

Llandysul North

Llandysul South

Llansysiliogogo

Llanfair Clydogau

Llanfarian

Llanfihangel y Creuddyn

Llangoedmor

Llangeitho

Llangrannog

Llanilar

Llanrhystyd

Llanllwchaiarn

Llansantffraed

Llanwnen

Llanwenog

Lledrod

Nantcwnlle

New Quay

Penbryn

Strata Florida

Taliesin

Talybont

Trefeurig

Tregaron

Troedyraur

Ysbyty Ystwyth

Election of Aldermen

Once again a number of aldermen who had not faced the electorate were elected. C.M. Williams and J.T. Morgan were elected aldermen for a third term (although the latter had not faced the electorate since 1889) and T.H.R. Hughes and James James for a second term. James James had been elected, from outside the Council, to an aldermanic vacancy in 1895 and so had never faced an election. David Lloyd, previously an alderman from 1889 until 1892 was elected for a second term. The other four aldermen were new appointments, including one Conservative, Colonel J.R. Howell.

C. M. Williams, Liberal (retiring alderman, from outside Council - did not seek election)
T. H. R. Hughes, Liberal (retiring alderman, from outside Council - did not seek election) 
D.J. Wiliams, Liberal (elected councillor at Tregaron)
Col. J.R. Howell, Conservative (elected councillor at Llandygwydd)
Dr David Lloyd, Liberal (elected councillor at Aberbanc)
Rev William Griffiths, Liberal (elected councillor at Llanllwchaiarn)
James James, Liberal (retiring alderman, from outside Council - did not seek election)
J.T. Morgan, Liberal (retiring alderman, from outside Council - did not seek election)

By-Elections
Three of the subsequent by-elections were contested.

Aberbanc by-election
Evan Davies, who had previously represented the ward from 1889 until 1895, was elected unopposed following David Lloyd's election as alderman.

Llandygwydd by-election

Llanllwchaiarn by-election

Tregaron by-election

References

1901
1901 Welsh local elections
20th century in Ceredigion